Mosimanegape Ramoshibidu is a Botswana footballer who currently plays for Botswana Meat Commission. He has won seven caps for the Botswana national football team.

External links

Living people
Botswana footballers
Gilport Lions F.C. players
Botswana international footballers
Botswana Defence Force XI F.C. players
1985 births
2012 Africa Cup of Nations players
Association football defenders